Shahab-e-Saqeb (missile), is an Iranian-made low altitude defense missile which was designed by Defense industry of Iran. This defensive missile has been built in order to annihilate diverse targets at low altitudes.

Shahab-e-Saqeb utilizes radio-guidance in the line of sight. Its length is about 2.9 meters, its weight is 84 kilograms, and its speed is approximately 740 meters per second. This indigenous Iranian missile's range is from 500 to 8500 meters against targets with a speed of 400 meters per second. This missile has also a range of 10 kilometers against the targets at a speed of three hundred meters per second and 11 kilometers against helicopters.

"Shahab-Saqib" capability of launching is through low altitude air defense system (via "Ya-Zahra and Herz-9" missile system). On the other hand, Karrar jet unmanned-aerial-vehicles are recently equipped with this kind of missile in order to hit air targets.

See also 
 List of military equipment manufactured in Iran
 Armed Forces of the Islamic Republic of Iran
 Defense industry of Iran
 Karrar

References

Islamic Republic of Iran Army
Surface-to-air missiles of Iran